SoftServe, Inc., founded in 1993 in Lviv, Ukraine, is a technology company specializing in consultancy services and software development. 
SoftServe provides services in the fields of big data, Internet of things, cloud computing, DevOps, e-commerce, computer security, experience design, and health care. With its United States headquarters in Austin, Texas and European headquarters in Lviv, Ukraine, the company employed more than 10,000 people in offices in 2021. It is one of the largest employer for software developers in Eastern Europe, and the largest outsourcing and outstaffing IT company in Ukraine.

History 

SoftServe was founded in 1993 in Lviv, Ukraine. Started by two post-graduate students of Lviv Polytechnic, it began as a software development company with headquarters in Lviv. The company was initially supported by the Rensselaer Polytechnic Institute Incubator Center and its first known client was General Electric. The company opened its first office in the United States in 2000. SoftServe was instrumental in building Microsoft Bird's Eye service in 2004. It used the same concept that was later used by Google for its Google Street View. For its work on the project, SoftServe was invited to speak at Microsoft's annual conference where it was used as an example of business applications that could be built by technology corporations.

In 2006, SoftServe founded SoftServe University. It became the company's corporate training program for improving developers and retraining specialists. Based in Ukraine, it also offers international IT Professional certificates to employees who complete the program. With the launch of SoftServe University, the company became the first to establish a corporate university in Ukraine. In 2008, SoftServe also founded Lviv Business School at Ukrainian Catholic University.

SoftServe opened its United States headquarters in Fort Myers, Florida in 2008 and began holding an annual conference. By 2012, SoftServe was one of the largest IT outsourcing companies in Ukraine with 2,189 employees, third only to EPAM Systems and Luxoft. 

In 2014 SoftServe moved its United States headquarters from Florida to One Congress Plaza, in Austin, Texas (The company had previously operated an office out of Austin since 2013 and officially moved its headquarters to One Congress Plaza in 2014.) The same year SoftServe opened offices in London, Amsterdam, Sofia, Wroclaw, and Stockholm. The same year its employee base climbed to 3,900 employeesAlso in 2014, the company acquired Amsterdam-based tech services firm Initium Consulting Group BV. (Founded in 2012 and served mainly healthcare and private equity industries.) SoftServe also acquired European IT company UGE UkrGermanEnterprise GmbH. 

In 2015 SoftServe opened a new European headquarters in Lviv, Ukraine. It also organized an event in San Francisco, California along with IT professionals from Ukraine and members of the Ukraine consulate to address concerns about the country's operations in light of the geo-political situation in Ukraine. The same year the company named Chris Baker as the new CEO, taking over the role from Co Founder Taras Kytsmey.

In January 2017, SoftServe acquired Wroclaw-based Coders Center, for between $1.5 million and $3 million. 

In September 2020, the company was targeted by a ransomware attack, in response SoftServe shut down many of their internal systems to try and stop the spread of the virus. SoftServe says there is no evidence that the virus spread to customers systems, and most of SoftServes internal systems were back online in a few hours to a few days. The hack resulted in bits of unfinished customer source code, and other information being shared on the internet. The individual who claims to be behind the hack, 'Freedomf0x', also published fragmented personal information of about 200 individual, but whether this information is linked to SoftServe employees is unclear. The attack targeted the company by exploiting the Windows tool Rainmeter. In response to the breach SoftServe partnered with multiple cyber and data security firms, and instituted new security policies.

Growth 
Around 2013 the company began large-scale growth. It opened new offices in the United States, Poland, London, Amsterdam, Sofia, and, Stockholm and began a still running (as of 2020) greater-than 20% per year growth streak. About the same time it reached $100 million in yearly revenue. In the following years SoftServe also purchased Initium Consulting Group BV and UGE UkrGermanEnterprise GmbH. Chris Baker was named the company's new CEO as growth continued as the company opened more offices in the United States and Europe. In In 2018 the company revenue was estimated to have surpassed the $250 million mark. By the end of 2020, despite the global pandemic, the company grew by at least 20%, reaching an estimated $450 million in revenue. The company is targeting a yearly revenue of $1 billion by 2025.

Products, Services and Partnerships

SoftServe is a software application development company as well as consulting firm. Its services include software optimization, software as a service, cloud computing, mobile, UI/UX, analytics, and security. It provides its services mainly in the healthcare, retail, and technology. One of the "SoftServe Business System" divisions also releases its own products, which are specially designed for Ukraine in order to find new technological solutions in IT. SoftServe has continuing partnerships with: Amazon Web Services, Google Cloud, Microsoft, Salesforce, Apigee, and other organizations.

Awards and recognition

Since 2004, SoftServe has been a member of the Microsoft Partner Ecosystem and was a finalist for the global Microsoft Partner of the Year in both 2006 and 2007. The company was recognized for the same award in 2008 and 2009 in Eastern Europe. SoftServe has continued to receive recognition from Microsoft, including by Microsoft Ukraine in 2012 for Partner of the Year, for Innovation in Business Analytics.

The company has won additional awards throughout the industries, including being named to the Global Outsourcing 100 list in 2010, 2011, 2013, 2014, and 2015. In 2010 SoftServe was named as Ukraine's Best Employer by Hewitt Associates and in 2011 named as Best Employer in Eastern Europe. In 2019, SoftServe ranked seventh out of more than 130 Western European companies in the Clutch software development category.

See also 

 Ciklum
 DataArt
 Eleks
 EPAM
 Infopulse Ukraine

References

External link

Software companies of Ukraine
Outsourcing companies
Software companies established in 1993
Economy of Lviv
Economy of Austin, Texas
Companies based in Lviv